The American Battle Monuments Commission (ABMC) is an independent agency of the United States government that administers, operates, and maintains permanent U.S. military cemeteries, memorials and monuments primarily outside the United States.

As of 2018, there were 26 cemeteries and 29 memorials, monuments and markers under the care of the ABMC. There are more than 140,000 U.S. servicemen and servicewomen interred at the cemeteries, and more than 94,000 missing in action, or lost or buried at sea are memorialized on cemetery Walls of the Missing and on three memorials in the United States. The ABMC also maintains an online database of names associated with each site.

History

The ABMC was established by the United States Congress in 1923. Its purpose is to:
 Commemorate the services of the U.S. armed forces where they have served since April 6, 1917;
 Establish suitable War memorials; designing, constructing, operating, and maintaining permanent U.S. military burial grounds in foreign countries;
 Control the design and construction of U.S. military monuments and markers in foreign countries by other U.S. citizens and organizations, both public and private;
 Encourage the maintenance of such monuments and markers by their sponsors.

The United States Department of War established eight European burial grounds for World War I. The ABMC's first program was landscaping and erecting non-sectarian chapels at each of the eight sites, constructing 11 separate monuments and two tablets at other sites in Europe, and constructing the Allied Expeditionary Forces World War I Memorial in Washington, D.C. For those buried who could not be identified during World War I, a percentage were commemorated by Star of David markers, rather than a cross; this practice was not continued for those who could not be identified during World War II.

In 1934, President Franklin D. Roosevelt signed an executive order transferring control of the eight cemeteries to the ABMC, and made the commission responsible for the design, construction, maintenance and operation of all future permanent American military burial grounds outside the United States.

The ABMC has been the caretaker of cemeteries, monuments and memorials for World War I, World War II, the Korean War, the Vietnam War and the Mexican–American War. In 2013,  Clark Veterans Cemetery in the Philippines became the 25th site under the control of the commission. Clark Veterans Cemetery dates back to the Philippine–American War at the turn of the 20th century. The Lafayette Escadrille Memorial Cemetery outside Paris, France was added to the commission's responsibilities in 2017.

Structure

The agency has its headquarters in Arlington, Virginia, and its Overseas Operations Office in Paris, France.

The authorizing legislation for the American Battle Monuments Commission (36 U.S.C., Chapter 21) specifies that the President may appoint up to 11 members to the commission (who serve indefinite terms and who serve without pay) and an officer of the Army to serve as the secretary.

Chairmen of the ABMC
 General of the Armies John J. Pershing (1923–1948)
 General of the Army George C. Marshall (1949–1959)
 General Jacob L. Devers (1960–1969)
 General Mark W. Clark (1969–1984)
 General Andrew Goodpaster (1985–1990)
 General Paul X. Kelley, (1991–1994, 2001–2005)
 General Frederick F. Woerner Jr. (1994–2001)
 General Frederick M. Franks Jr. (2005–2009)
 General Merrill McPeak (2010–2018)
 David Urban (2018–2021)
 Lieutenant General Mark Hertling (2021–present)

Board of Commissioners
10 Commissioners were appointed by President Joe Biden on September 28, 2021: Darrell L. Dorgan; John L. Estrada; Florent Groberg; Amy Looney Heffernan; Matthew E. Jones; Raymond D. Kemp, Sr.; Bud D. Pettigrew; Michael E. Smith; Gail Berry West; and Daniel P. Woodward. Mark P. Hertling was originally appointed as secretary on the same day, but was later appointed as commissioner, and was elected as chairman on December 13, 2021.

Secretary
 Charles K. Djou

Operations

The American Battle Monuments Commission employs a full-time staff of 482 people around the world in 2022. All ABMC sites are open from 9 a.m. to 5 p.m., seven days a week, with the exception of Christmas Day and New Year's Day. Cemeteries are not closed for national holidays. When the sites are open to the public, a commission staff member is available to escort visitors and relatives to grave and memorial sites or to answer questions.

Cemeteries and Memorials of the ABMC

Monuments of the ABMC

See also 
 American War Memorials Overseas
 National Register of Historic Places

Other national war graves commissions 
 Austria – Austrian Black Cross (Austrian War graves on the Vienna Central cemetery are still looked after by German War Graves Commission)
 France – Ministère de la Défense
 Germany – German War Graves Commission
 Netherlands – Oorlogsgravenstichting (Dutch Wikipedia)
 Russia – Association of War Memorials
 United Kingdom, Canada, Australia, New Zealand, India and South Africa – Commonwealth War Graves Commission (CWGC)

References

 Nishiura, Elizabeth, editor (1989). American Battle Monuments: A Guide to Military Cemeteries and Monuments Maintained by the American Battle Monuments Commission. Detroit, Michigan: Omnigraphics Inc. . 
 Hallowed Grounds (2009). PBS video of 11 America's overseas military cemeteries in eight countries.

Bibliography
 Selected photos available online through the Washington State Library's Classics in Washington History collection
  Maps available online through the Washington State Office of the Secretary of State's Washington History collection

External links

 Official website

 
Military monuments and memorials in the United States
Organizations based in Arlington County, Virginia
Independent agencies of the United States government
United States federal boards, commissions, and committees
1923 establishments in Virginia
Government agencies established in 1923